The  are a Japanese women's softball team based in Anjo, Aichi. The Bright Pegasus compete in the Japan Diamond Softball League (JD.League) as a member of the league's East Division.

History
The Bright Pegasus were founded in 1960, as Denso softball team.

The Japan Diamond Softball League (JD.League) was founded in 2022, and the Bright Pegasus became part of the new league as a member of the East Division.

Roster

References

External links
 
 Denso Bright Pegasus - JD.League
 

Japan Diamond Softball League
Women's softball teams in Japan
Sports teams in Aichi Prefecture